The 1984 NCAA Women's Gymnastics championship involved 10 schools competing for the national championship of women's NCAA Division I gymnastics.  It was the third NCAA gymnastics national championship and the defending NCAA Team Champion for 1983 was Utah.  The Competition took place in Los Angeles, California hosted by UCLA in Pauley Pavilion.

Team Results

Top Ten Individual All-Around Results

Individual Event Finals Results

Vault

Uneven Bars

Balance Beam

Floor Exercise

External links
  Gym Results

NCAA Women's Gymnastics championship
NCAA Women's Gymnastics Championship